Naueti (also written as Nauoti, Nauete and Nauweti but ultimately from Naueti  'now') is an Austronesian language spoken by 15,045 (census 2010) in the subdistricts of Uato-Lari, Uatucarbau and Baguia in southeastern East Timor. 1,062 Naueti are living in Baguia.

It is closely related to Waima'a, Kairui and Midiki, three other Austronesian languages spoken on Timor. The Australian linguist Geoffrey Hull coined the acronym Kawaimina to refer to them as a dialect continuum but it is preferable to understand them as separate languages. The Dutch linguist Aone Van Engelenhoven applies the label Eastern Extra-Ramelaic languages.

Structurally, it is a highly isolating Malayo-Polynesian language. However, its vocabulary is to some extent Papuan, due to contact with Makasae, which surrounds and cohabits with Naueti. There exist at least two dialects of Naueti, the Uatolari and the Uatocarbau-Baguia Naueti, the latter being distinguishable through some vocabulary but also through the  allophone of  before rounded vowels (e.g.  'war' is pronounced  in Uatolari but  in Uatocarbau and Baguia).

Just like its low-level related languages, Naueti has aspirated stops and voiceless sonorants but shows preglottalized phonemes instead of ejectives and has no preglottalized counterpart of Waima'a and Midiki . In contrast, Naueti has a voiceless rhotic that is missing in the other inventories.

There is no distinctive vowel length, as vowel sequences are heterosyllabic. Stress generally falls on the penultimate syllable, with very few native exceptions. Loanwords preserve their original stress.

References

Timor–Babar languages
Languages of East Timor
Isolating languages